The Minister for Transport in Ghana is the political head of the Ministry of Transport of Ghana. The scope of the responsibilities of this position has varied over the years. Since 2009, the Ministries of Aviation, Harbours and Railways and the Road Transport Services have been covered by one single agency, the Ministry of Transport. In previous years, the position had often been known as the Minister for Transport and Communications. In 2014, the Communications section of the Ministry was merged with the Ministry of Information to form a new Ministry of Communications with its own substantive minister, the Minister for Communications.

List of ministers

References

Politics of Ghana
Transport
Transport ministers of Ghana